"Shoop" is the lead single released from American hip hop group Salt-N-Pepa's fourth studio album, Very Necessary (1993). It was produced by Sandra 'Pepa' Denton, Mark Sparks and group member Salt. The song features an uncredited verse by rapper Otwane "Big Twan Lov-Her" Roberts (not to be confused with hardcore rapper "Big Twan"). Released in September 1993, the song became one of the group's more successful singles, reaching number four on the Billboard Hot 100 and topping the Hot Rap Singles chart at number one (their second single to do so). Two months after its release, "Shoop" was certified gold by the RIAA; it went on to sell 1.2 million copies. The success of both this single and the follow-up single "Whatta Man" propelled Very Necessary to sell over 5 million copies in the US, becoming the group's best-selling album.

This song uses a sample of a version of Ike Turner's "I'm Blue (The Gong-Gong Song)" from The Sweet Inspirations, and the line "the voodoo that you do so well" was quoted from Cole Porter's 1929 song "You Do Something to Me".

Critical reception
Larry Flick from Billboard viewed the song as a "funky, funky midtempo jam", noting that it "teases and breezes over sexy, shuffling beats." John Martinucci from the Gavin Report stated, "Over the years they have delivered some cool tracks and "Shoop" is no exception. Laid-back and all, the trio takes control as they scope themselves out a guy and make the moves on him. Refreshing change, `ey, guys?" Insider stated that "this catchy song helped make Salt-N-Pepa bonafide stars and marked the beginnings of their artistic freedom." Pan-European magazine Music & Media felt it has "a spicey poppy rap style we had almost forgotten." Alan Jones from Music Week rated the song four out of five, declaring it as "a perfect showcase for the rappers, who feed off each other well, and with great humour." Wendi Cermak from The Network Forty noted that here, "a funky low groove rolls along under smooth rap." 

Toure from The New York Times called it "a sexy little tribute to the male bodies that drive these rappers crazy", "pulsing with a funky bass line". A reviewer from People magazine wrote that "Shoop" "is a grinding, bluesy come-on that overflows with good-natured lewdness." In an retrospective review, Pop Rescue stated the song has "a wonderful beat vs rap relationship going on here". James Hamilton from the RM Dance Update deemed it a "Ikettes 'I'm Blue' based (that's Tina you can hear) funkily rolling sexy lurcher". Also Tom Doyle from Smash Hits gave it four out of five, describing it as a "stomping rap thing" and "another dance classic". He found that the chorus "simultaneously manages to go 'shoop shoop shoop' and rip off the 'whoah whoah whoah' bit from the Stereo MC's' 'Connected'." Charles Aaron from Spin commented, "Flipping the sexist script, the queens of hip hop display their own well-toned talents. While lounging at the beach, they appreciate a plethora of spandex-bottomed fellas. Joyous, equal-opportunity physicality. The butt equivalent of Queen Latifah's "Ladies First"."

The Village Voice listed "Shoop" number 62 on its list of the Top Singles of the 1990s in 1999.

Music video
A music video was produced to promote the single, directed by American film director Scott Kalvert. It was filmed at Coney Island and begins with Salt 'N' Pepa driving up in a Mercedes convertible at the beach and later flirting with some men. They also sing on an illuminated set as they dance with dancers which included all costume jewelry by Ziggy Attias, Ziggy Originals, NYC.

Track listing
 Maxi single
 "Shoop" - (LP version)
 "Shoop" - (Guru's version)
 "Shoop" - (Danny D's R & B mix)
 "Let's Talk About AIDS
 "Shoop" - (TRUE instrumental)
 "Shoop" - (a cappella)
 "Emphatically No"
 "I've Got AIDS" - (public service announcement)

Charts

Weekly charts

Year-end charts

Certifications and sales

Release history

References

1993 singles
1993 songs
FFRR Records singles
Next Plateau Entertainment singles
Salt-N-Pepa songs